The 2015 Oyo State House of Assembly election was held on April 1, 2015, to elect members of the Oyo State House of Assembly in Nigeria. All the 32 seats were up for election in the Oyo State House of Assembly.

Results

Akinyele I 
A candidate Oyebamiji Joshua won the election.

Ibadan North West 
APC candidate Oladipo Abimbola won the election.

Akinyele II 
APC candidate Badmus Saheed won the election.

Saki West 
APC candidate Musa Wasi won the election.

Afijio 
APC candidate Oyatokun Oyeleke Adeyemi won the election.

Lagelu 
APC candidate Akinmoyede Olafioye won the election.

Iwajowa 
APC candidate Okunlola Adelere won the election.

Kajola 
APC candidate Olalere Adebayo won the election.

Iseyin/Itesiwaju 
APC candidate Afeez Adeleke won the election.

Irepo/Olorunsogo 
APC candidate Oseni Ganiyu won the election.

Oorelope 
LP candidate Aremu Tunji won the election.

Atisbo/Saki East 
APC candidate Sangodipe Michael won the election.

Egbeda 
A candidate Oguntade Olasunkanmi won the election.

Ogo Oluwa/Surulere 
LP candidate Oyetunji Olusegun won the election.

Ido 
APC candidate Olalere Adekunle won the election.

Ibarapa East 
APC candidate Michael Adeyemo won the election.

Ibadan South East II 
A candidate Hakeem Ige won the election.

Ibadan South East I 
A candidate Adesina Fatai won the election.

Ibarapa Central/Ibarapa North 
APC candidate Jimoh Akintunde won the election.

Ibadan South West II 
APC candidate Ajanaku Olusegun won the election.

Ibadan South West I 
APC candidate Subair Hassan won the election.

Ogbomoso South 
LP candidate Akande Solomon won the election.

Ogbomoso North 
LP candidate Oladeji Olawumi won the election.

Oluyole 
APC candidate Wahab Abiodun won the election.

Ibadan North II 
APC candidate Olaleye Olaniyi won the election.

Ibadan North I 
APC candidate Agbaje Olufunke won the election.

Oyo East/Oyo West 
A candidate Olagunju Olalekan won the election.

Ona Ara 
A candidate Azeez Adesina won the election.

Ibadan North East II 
A candidate Adeoye Adeniyi won the election.

Ibadan North East I 
A candidate Oloya Ayinla won the election.

Atiba 
LP candidate Oyekola Joseph won the election.

Oriire 
LP candidate Ojo Olagunju won the election.

References 

Oyo State elections
Oyo